Strmca (in older sources Strmec) is a small settlement northeast of Nova Vas in the Municipality of Bloke in the Inner Carniola region of Slovenia.

References

External links

Strmca on Geopedia

Populated places in the Municipality of Bloke